The 1986 Hawaii gubernatorial election was Hawaii's eighth gubernatorial election.  The election was held on November 4, 1986, and resulted in a victory for the Democratic candidate, Lt. Gov. John D. Waiheʻe III over the Republican candidate, State Senator D. G. Anderson.  Waihee received more votes than Anderson in every county in the state.

This was Anderson's second loss for the position of governor, having previously lost the 1982 election.

Primaries
Primary elections were held on September 20, 1986.

Democratic Primary
Candidates and primary votes:
John D. Waihee III, lieutenant governor: 45.60%
Cecil Heftel, United States representative: 36.25%
Patsy Mink, former United States representative: 16.41%
Anthony N. Hodges: 0.75%
Billy Kuaiwa: 0.40%
Paul H. Snider: 0.32%
John P. Fritz: 0.28%

Republican Primary
Candidates and primary votes:
D. G. Anderson, state senator: 94.61%
Wayne C. Thiessen: 3.12%
Charles Hirayasu: 1.30%
Jack J. Mahakian: 0.98%

General election

References

1986
1986 United States gubernatorial elections
November 1986 events in the United States
1986 Hawaii elections